Kinsale is a historic port and fishing town in County Cork, Ireland.

Kinsale is a holiday destination for both Irish and overseas tourists. The town is known for its restaurants, including the Michelin-starred Bastion restaurant, and holds a number of annual gourmet food festivals.

Kinsale is in the Cork South-West (Dáil Éireann) constituency, which has three seats.

History

In 1333, under a charter granted by King Edward III of England, the Corporation of Kinsale was established to undertake local government in the town. 

The corporation existed for over 500 years until the passing of the Municipal Corporations (Ireland) Act 1840, when local government in Kinsale was transferred to the town commissioners who had been elected in the town since 1828. These Town Commissioners became the Kinsale Council under the Local Government (Ireland) Act 1898 and the Kinsale Town Council existed until 2014 when this layer of local government was abolished in Ireland as part of measures to reduce the budget deficit following the financial crisis of 2008–2010 (see Post-2008 Irish economic downturn). It returned two members to the Irish House of Commons prior to its abolition in 1800.

In its history, Kinsale has also important occasional links with Spain.  In 1518 Archduke Ferdinand, later Emperor Ferdinand I, paid an unscheduled visit to the town, during which one of his staff wrote a remarkable account of its inhabitants.

In 1601, a Spanish military expedition – the last of the Armadas launched against the Kingdom of England – landed in Kinsale in order to link with Irish rebel forces and attack England through Ireland. As a result, the battle of Kinsale took place at the end of the Nine Years War in which English forces, led by Charles Blount, 8th Baron Mountjoy, defeated the rebel Irish force, led by Hugh O'Neill, 2nd Earl of Tyrone and Red Hugh O'Donnell, two Gaelic princes from Ulster. The Irish forces were allied with the forces of King Felipe III of Spain, who was also King of Portugal and the Algarves. 

In September 1607, a few years after this battle, the Flight of the Earls took place from Rathmullan in County Donegal in West Ulster in which a number of the native Irish aristocrats, including both Hugh O'Neill, 2nd Earl of Tyrone and Rory O'Donnell, 1st Earl of Tyrconnell, abandoned their lands and fled to Continental Europe. Shortly after the battle, James's Fort was built to protect the harbour.

In 1649, Prince Rupert of the Rhine declared Charles II as King of England, Scotland and Ireland at St Multose's Church in Kinsale upon hearing of the execution of Charles I in London by Parliamentarian forces during the English Civil War. The Virginia trading fleet made this harbour the safest destination during their wartime voyages.

Charles Fort, located at Summer Cove and dating from 1677 in the reign of Charles II, is a bastion-fort that guards the entrance to Kinsale Harbour. It was built to protect the area and specifically the harbour from the use by the French and Spanish in the event of a landing in Ireland. James's Fort, which dates from the reign of King James VI and I, is located on the other side of the cove, on the Castlepark peninsula. An underwater chain used to be strung between the two forts across the harbour mouth during times of war to scuttle enemy shipping by ripping the bottoms out of incoming vessels.

King James II and VII (he was King James II of England and Ireland and King James VII of Scots) landed at Kinsale in March 1689 with a force of 2,500 men, raised with the support of King Louis XIV, as part of his campaign to regain power in England, Scotland and Ireland. In 1690, James II and VII returned to exile in France from Kinsale, following his defeat at the Battle of the Boyne by William III of England (also Stadtholder William III of the House of Orange-Nassau) after the 'Glorious Revolution' (or Revolution of 1688) in England against the background of wars involving France under King Louis XIV.

From 1694, Kinsale served as a supply base for Royal Navy vessels in southern Ireland, and a number of storehouses were built; it was limited to smaller vessels, however, due to the sandbar at the mouth of the river. 

English navigator and privateer Captain Woodes Roger mentions Kinsale in the memoir of his 1708 expedition from Cork; in particular, he mentions a pair of rocks known as 'the Sovereigne's Bollacks' on which his ship almost ran aground. Kinsale's naval significance declined after the Royal Navy moved its victualling centre from Kinsale to Cork harbour in 1805 during the Napoleonic Wars in the period of France's First Empire.

When the ocean liner RMS Lusitania was sunk by a U-boat of the German Empire on 7 May 1915 on a voyage from New York City to Liverpool during the First World War, some of the bodies and survivors were brought to Kinsale and the subsequent inquest on the bodies recovered was held in the town's courthouse. A statue in the harbour commemorates the effort. The Lusitania memorial is at Casement Square in Cobh, to the east of Cork city.

Kinsale was linked by a branch line via Farrangalway and Ballymartle to the Irish railway system of the Cork, Bandon and South Coast Railway and its successors from 1863 until 1931, when the branch was closed by the Great Southern Railways during a low point in Kinsale's economic fortunes. The station, inconveniently located for the town and harbour, was on Barrack Hill and the line ran to a junction at Crossbarry on the Cork (Albert Quay) to Bandon line.

In 2005, Kinsale became Ireland's second Fair Trade Town, with Clonakilty being the first. Kinsale, with its "electrifyingly bright streets", was rated as among the "20 most beautiful villages in the UK and Ireland" by Condé Nast Traveler in 2020.

Transport
Bus Éireann provides Kinsale's primary means of public transport. Buses regularly operate from Kinsale to Cork City, with most of these stopping at Cork Airport on the way.  Kinsale and Bandon are linked by public transport with a bus service provided by East Cork Rural Transport.

The Archdeacon Duggan Bridge, on the R600 road to the south-west of the town, was opened in March 1977 and named after Father Tom Duggan MC OBE, a chaplain in both WWI and WWII, and later a missionary priest in Peru.

Education
There are a number of primary and secondary-level schools in the area. The town's community school was awarded "Best School in the Republic of Ireland" twice, as well as receiving awards at the BT Young Scientist Exhibition in 2014.

Kinsale College offers a number of further education courses, and the town also has a school of English.

Community and sports groups
Kinsale Yacht Club (KYC) began in 1950 and today is a sailing club that runs events for all ages of sailors and social activities throughout the year. Junior sailing includes Optimists, Lasers and 420's. The yacht classes include Squib (keelboat), International Dragon (keelboat) and A-Class Catamaran as well as three Cruiser Classes (Class I, II and III).

Founded in 1982, the grounds of Kinsale Rugby Football Club are used for the annual Kinsale Sevens event, which attracts international teams and thousands of spectators annually.

The Kinsale GAA club plays in the Carrigdhoun division of Cork GAA. They won the Cork Football Intermediate County Championship in 2011, the first time since 1915.

Kinsale Badminton club which is affiliated with Badminton Ireland is based in St Multose Hall Kinsale. It caters for both adult and juvenile players and enters teams in Cork county Leagues and Cups.

The Kinsale Branch of the Irish Red Cross has been in existence since 1939 and is staffed by volunteers, who are present at local events and activities – including the annual Kinsale Sevens rugby event. The Kinsale Red Cross has 2 ambulances which are housed in a purpose-built building in Church Lane and crewed by trained volunteers.

Kinsale competes in the Irish Tidy Towns Competition and was the overall winner in 1986.

Kinsale is the first 'Transition Town' in Ireland, and the Transition Town community organisation, supported by Kinsale town council, holds meetings locally. It has taken some guidance from the Kinsale Energy Descent Action Plan 2021, which has spawned further Transition Towns worldwide.

Entertainment and culture

Kinsale hosts an annual jazz festival, which takes place during the last weekend of October. Pubs and hotels in the town host concerts by jazz and blues groups throughout the weekend, including on the last Monday of October (which is a bank holiday in Ireland).

The monumental steel, originally unpainted, sculpture The Great Wall of Kinsale, by Eilis O'Connell and installed in 1988 to celebrate Kinsale's achievements in the Tidy Towns competition, stands by Pier Road and Town Park.

Bastion, a restaurant on Market/Main streets, received a Michelin Star in 2020. Chef Keith Floyd was previously a resident of Kinsale.

Government and politics

The town forms part of the Bandon-Kinsale electoral district on Cork County Council and is part of the Cork South-West constituency for Dáil Éireann elections.

Twin towns – Sister cities
Kinsale is twinned with:
 Newport, Rhode Island, United States
  Mumbles, Wales
  Portofino, Italy
  Antibes, France

Development
Residential developments in the 21st century include the Convent Garden scheme near the historic centre. This development involves the conversion of the former St Josephs Convent of the Sisters of Mercy on Ramparts Lane into 79 apartments and the building of 94 houses in the grounds. After several years of inactivity, construction and sales activity recommenced in 2015 and 2016.

A further residential development, Abbey Fort, includes 260 units at the north end of Kinsale. Initial phases were completed in 2007–2012. Part of the 22-acre site at Abbey Fort was sold by the National Asset Management Agency in December 2015.

Demographics
As of the 2011 census, ethnically Kinsale was 76.5% White Irish, 18.5% other white, 0.5% black, 1% Asian, and 1% 'other', with 2.5% not stated. In terms of religion, the 2011 census captured a population that was 76% Catholic, 10% other stated religions (mainly Protestant), 11% with no religion, and 3% not stated.

Notable people

Henry Rowe (1812–1870), architect
Achilles Daunt (1832–1878), Church of Ireland clergyman; born in Kinsale
Mary Baptist Russell (1829– 1898) Mercy Sister, nurse, philanthropist, and educator
Aidan Higgins (1927–2015), poet and novelist; lived in Kinsale
Aisling Judge (b.1991), scientist and winner of the Young Scientist and Technology Exhibition. Born in Kinsale
Anne Bonny (1702–1782), female pirate; born near Kinsale
Arthur O'Connor (1763–1852), president of the United Irishmen and a general in Napoleon's armies; lived near Kinsale
Ciara Judge (b.1998), scientist and 2014 Grand Prize Winner of Google Science Fair. Born in Kinsale
Derek Mahon (b.1941), Northern Irish poet; lives in Kinsale
Desmond O'Grady (1935–2014), poet; lived in Kinsale
Eamonn O'Neill (1882–1954) Kinsale businessman and politician
Edward Bowen (1780–1866), Canadian judge and lawyer; born in Kinsale
Eileen Desmond (1932–2005), TD, senator, MEP, and government minister; born in Kinsale
Ethel Colburn Mayne (1865–1941), writer, biographer, literary critic, journalist and translator; grew up in Kinsale
Finbar Wright (b.1957), tenor; born near Kinsale
Gervais Parker (1695–1750), British Army officer; Governor of Kinsale
Jack Barrett (1910–1979), All-Ireland winning hurler; born in Kinsale
James Dennis, 1st Baron Tracton (1721–1782), Irish judge and politician; born near Kinsale
John Duncan Craig (1830–1909), poet and Church of Ireland clergyman; lived in Kinsale
John Fergus O'Hea (c. 1838–1922); political cartoonist AKA "Spex"; born in Kinsale
John Folliot (1691–1762), British Army officer; Lieutenant-Governor of Kinsale
John Handcock (1755–1786), British Army officer; Lieutenant-Governor of Kinsale
John Sullivan (1830–1884), recipient of the Victoria Cross
John William Fenton (1828–1890), musician; born in Kinsale
Joseph Ward (1832–1872), British soldier and recipient of the Victoria Cross; born in Kinsale
Keith Floyd (1943–2009), chef; lived near Kinsale
Lennox Robinson (1886–1958), poet and dramatist; lived in Kinsale
Mother Mary Francis (1813–1888), born as Joanna Bridgeman, nun and nursing pioneer; lived in Kinsale
Moira Deady (1922–2010), actress; lived in Kinsale
Mortimer McCarthy (1882–1967), sailor and Antarctic explorer on Scott's Terra Nova Expedition; born in Kinsale
Paddy Collins (1903–1995), All-Ireland winning hurler; born in Kinsale
Padraic Fallon (1905–1974), poet; lived in Kinsale
Patrick Cotter O'Brien (1760–1806), first man verified to have reached over 8 feet in height; born in Kinsale
Peter McDermott (1918–2011), All-Ireland winning footballer for County Meath; born near Kinsale
Ray Cummins (b.1948), All-Ireland winning Hurler; lives in Kinsale
Rev. Patrick MacSwiney (1885–1940), priest, scholar, antiquarian, historian and founder of the Kinsale Regional Museum
Robert Gibbings (1889–1958), artist and author; lived in Kinsale
Ron Holland (b.1947), yacht designer; lives in Kinsale
SEARLS (b. 1991), songwriter and West End performer; born in Kinsale
Sir Robert Southwell (1635–1702), diplomat, Secretary of State for Ireland and president of the Royal Society; born near Kinsale
Thomas Johnson (1872–1963), first leader of the Irish Labour Party in Dáil Éireann; lived in Kinsale
Timothy McCarthy (1888–1917), sailor and explorer on Ernest Shackleton's Imperial Trans-Antarctic Expedition; born in Kinsale
Timothy O'Keeffe (1926–1994), publisher who worked with Flann O'Brien; born in Kinsale
Tony Scannell (1945–2020), actor; born in Kinsale
William Penn (1644–1718), founder of the State of Pennsylvania; was Clerk of the Admiralty Court in Kinsale
Henry Bathurst (1623-1676),  Recorder of Cork, was also Recorder of Kinsale  and  lived at Castlepark in Kinsale

See also
 List of towns and villages in Ireland
 List of RNLI stations
 Market Houses in Ireland
 Kinsale (Parliament of Ireland constituency)

References

External links 

Kinsale Chamber of Tourism & Business – Official Website
Kinsale Sports & Community Centre
Kinsale & District Newsletter

 
Towns and villages in County Cork
Former boroughs in the Republic of Ireland
Port cities and towns in the Republic of Ireland